Luis Chávez may refer to:

 Luis Chávez (footballer) (born 1996), Mexican footballer
 Luis Antonio Chávez (died 2010), Honduran journalist and radio host